Fred Otto Nimz (April 22, 1914 – May 9, 1992) was an American professional basketball player. He played for the Oshkosh All-Stars in the National Basketball League and the Baltimore Bullets in the American Basketball League. He also competed for various independent league teams.

References

1914 births
1992 deaths
American men's basketball players
United States Navy personnel of World War II
Baltimore Bullets (1944–1954) players
Basketball players from Wisconsin
Centers (basketball)
Forwards (basketball)
Military personnel from Wisconsin
Oshkosh All-Stars players
Sportspeople from Wausau, Wisconsin
Wisconsin–Stevens Point Pointers men's basketball players